The PSA World Series (formerly known as the PSA Super Series) was a series of men's and women's squash tournaments which were part of the Professional Squash Association (PSA) World Tour for the squash season. The tournaments were some of the most prestigious events on the men's tour. The best-performing players in the World Series events qualified for the annual PSA World Series Finals tournament. 

Each year, several tournaments on the tour were designated World Series events. These included major events such as the World Championship, the British Open, the Hong Kong Open or the Tournament of Champions. Then, early the next year, the eight best-performing players from the Super Series events were invited to compete in the PSA World Series Finals (a similar event to the ATP World Tour Finals). 

The World Series Squash Finals were first staged in Vitis Club in Zurich, Switzerland, in 1993 and 1994. The event was then moved to England and held at the Galleria shopping complex in Hatfield from 1996 to 1998. From 1999 to 2006, it was held in the Broadgate Arena in London. In 2007, the event was moved to the National Squash Centre in Manchester. In 2009, the tournament was shortened to a four-day format and played at the Queen's Club in London.

From January 2015, it also included World Series tournaments for women after a merger between PSA and WSA in November 2014.

After 2017–18, the PSA World Series was replaced by the PSA World Tour and PSA World Tour finals.

Tournaments
Here is the list of tournaments that have been at least a season PSA World Series tournament since 1993 :

PSA World Series ranking points
PSA World Series events also had a separate World Series ranking. Points for this were calculated on a cumulative basis after each World Series event. The top eight players at the end of the calendar year were then eligible to play in the PSA World Series Finals.

At the same time, the players competing in PSA World Series events earned world ranking points according to the prize money, the classification of the event and the final position in the draw the player reached.

World Series Finals

Men's

Women's

See also
Professional Squash Association
WSA World Series
Official Men's Squash World Ranking
Official Women's Squash World Ranking

References

External links 
 World Series Series Squash website

Squash tournaments
Sports competition series